Chalet Boonsingkarn is a Thai Olympic boxer. He represented his country in the light-middleweight division at the 1992 Summer Olympics. He won his first bout against Luca Franca, but lost his second against Orhan Delibaș.

References

1967 births
Living people
Chalit Boonsingkarn
Chalit Boonsingkarn
Boxers at the 1992 Summer Olympics
Light-middleweight boxers